The 2017 National Premier Leagues Grand Final was the fifth National Premier Leagues Grand Final. It was played on 30 September 2017 at Perry Park in Brisbane between Brisbane Strikers and Heidelberg United. Heidelberg won 2–0 to secure their inaugural National Premier Leagues title.

Route to the final

Match

Statistics

References

2010s in Queensland
September 2017 sports events in Australia
Soccer in Brisbane
Grand finals